N.V. Dash F.C. Inter Wanica, referred to as Inter Wanica, is a football club located in Kwatta, Suriname.

History 
The club was founded in 1942 as Nishan 42.

They played their first season in the SVB Hoofdklasse in 2015–16, following promotion from the SVB Eerste Klasse. They won their first SVB Cup, Suriname's top cup tournament, during the 2014–15 season. Then they played the President's Cup in 2015 and won it for the first time also.

The club changed its name from S.V. Nishan 42 to its current name in 2019.

Notable former coaches
  Roberto Gödeken (2014–2017)

Honours
Beker van Suriname: 1
 2014–15

Suriname Presidents Cup: 1
 2015

SVB Eerste Klasse (second division): 1
 2014–15

Current squad
2022 Squads

References

Nishan 42
Nishan 42
Association football clubs established in 1942